Garry Lo (born 1 November 1993) is a Papua New Guinean rugby league footballer who plays for the Waghi Tumbe in the Digicel Cup. Lo plays as a winger. He is also a Papua New Guinea international.

He represented Papua New Guinea in the 2017 Rugby League World Cup.

Early years
Born in Mount Hagen, Papua New Guinea, Lo played junior rugby league in local rugby league clubs and then played for Gomis Panthers RLFC in Mount Hagen.

Playing career

2011
Mount Hagen Eagles, a local rugby league club in the Digicel Cup, had him in a train and trial in the off-season and he eventually earned a spot in the wing and centres, he played with Mount Hagen Eagles for another season in 2012.

2013
Due to study commitments at the University of Papua New Guinea in Port Moresby, he left Mount Hagen Eagles and was signed by Port Moresby Vipers, where he played for the rest of 2013 season when Port Moresby Vipers won the 2013 Digicel Cup premiership.

PNG Hunters
In their début season in the Queensland Cup, a second tier competition in Australia, PNG Hunters selected Lo among other emerging players. He impressed the rugby league fans in Queensland, Australia and Papua New Guinea with his speed and power on the flanks and was dubbed as a try-scoring machine and 'mini Matt Utai'. In 2014, he was awarded the top try scorer award in the Queensland Cup for his season's total of 24 tries.

During the 2014 off-season, Garry left for Gateshead Thunder in England with his club-mate Jason Tali and Mark Mexico joining from NRL club Cronulla Sharks, which made the headlines in the local news. A controversial signing in which Stanley Gene was criticized for player grabbing.

But in a twist, he left England and came back to Papua New Guinea and apologized to the Hunters team for the wrong decision he made to leave them. However, the PNG Hunters made it very clear that there would be no fast return for the Kumuls winger, as he seeks to rejoin the team for the 2015 Queensland Cup

Lo then announced that he would join his original club, Mount Hagen Eagles in the Digicel Cup in 2015, where he was appointed captain.

Just before the Digicel Cup kick off, PNG Hunters Coach, Michael Marum, named Garry Lo in round 6 in an extended 21 player team to take on the inform Mackay Cutters, after poor performance and injuries to strike players for PNG Hunters.

Sheffield Eagles
Lo then brought his career back to England by joining Championship side Sheffield Eagles, again along with fellow countryman Mark Mexico. Here he became noticed for pitch-length runs, often resulting in a try. He scored more tries than games played with a 46/50 games/tries record. This resulted in 200 points scored for the Eagles in just two seasons.

Castleford Tigers
Lo signed a two-year deal with Super League side Castleford Tigers (Heritage № 982) on 22 September 2017 with a deal with the Sheffield Eagles that is on loan. This gives both clubs the option of playing him when he doesn't play for his parent club. The Papua New Guinean scored on his Super League debut in a 28–12 defeat by Wigan.

International career
Garry Lo has played five times for Papua New Guinea, scoring four tries so far. He was named in the Papua New Guinea national team for the 2017 World Cup after an impressive season in England. His World Cup exploits were impressive too, as he scored twice against Ireland and England.

Police Inquiry
In April 2018 Castleford stood down Lo as he 'voluntarily assisted a police inquiry', but neither the club nor West Yorkshire Police would disclose any further information.

References

External links
Castleford Tigers profile
2017 RLWC profile
SL profile
Intrust Super Cup
PNG Hunters
Gary Lo returns to PNG, apologizes to the Hunters Team 
Gateshead sign Gary Lo and three other PNG stars
PNG players embroiled in contract dispute

1993 births
Living people
AS Carcassonne players
Castleford Tigers players
Papua New Guinea Hunters players
Papua New Guinea national rugby league team players
Papua New Guinean rugby league players
Port Moresby Vipers players
Rugby league centres
Rugby league wingers
Sheffield Eagles players
People from the Western Highlands Province